Das Herz is a German-language opera by Hans Pfitzner to a libretto by Hans Mahner-Mons. It received concurrent premieres in 1930 in Berlin and Munich.

Recordings
Das Herz - Andre Wenhold (baritone), Volker Horn (tenor), Roberta Cunningham (soprano), Beth Johanning (soprano), Gerhard Stephan (bass) Thuringian Landestheater Chorus, Thuringian Symphony Orchestra Rolf Reuter 2CD Marco Polo 1993

References

Operas
1930 operas
Operas by Hans Pfitzner
German-language operas